For the 1966–67 season, Carlisle United F.C. competed in Football League Division Two.

Results and fixtures

Football League Second Division

Football League Cup

FA Cup

References
 11v11

Carlisle United F.C. seasons